The Africa Movie Academy Award for Best Visual Effects is an annual merit by the Africa Film Academy to reward movies with the best visual effects for the year. It was introduced in 2005 as Best Special effects, and has been known as Best Visual Effects since the second edition till date except the 4th edition when it was simply called Best Effects.

References

Lists of award winners
Africa Movie Academy Awards